Matthew or Matt Clarke may refer to:

Matthew Clarke (Australian footballer) (born 1973), Australian rules footballer
Matthew Clarke (runner) (born 1995), Australian runner
Matthew Clarke (footballer, born 1980), footballer who has played for Darlington and Bradford City
Matthew Clarke (footballer, born 1996), footballer who plays for West Bromwich Albion, on loan from Brighton & Hove Albion
Matt Clarke (footballer, born 1973), former football goalkeeper
Matthew Clarke, Lord Clarke (born 1945), Scottish judge
Matthew St. Clair Clarke (1790–1852), Clerk of the US House of Representatives
Matthew Clarke (politician) (1863–1923), Australian politician

See also
Matthew Clark (disambiguation)
Matthew Clerk (1659–1735), Presbyterian minister